Delta Wedding is a 1946 Southern fiction novel by Eudora Welty.  Set in 1923, the novel tells of the experiences of the Fairchild family in a domestic drama-filled week leading up to Dabney Fairchild's wedding to the family overseer, Troy Flavin, during an otherwise unexceptional year in the Mississippi Delta.

Reception 
The novel's focus on the mundane and social life of the central South elicited considerable critique from contemporary critics. Initial reception of the novel was chequered, with many reviewers challenging the absence of plot. The New York Times praised the characterization of the novel. It describes the novel as going "deep into the motives and moods and compulsions that move her characters". The interplay of family life, with a dozen different people saying and doing a dozen different things all at the same time, is wonderfully handled by Miss Welty so that no detail is lost, every detail had its place in the pattern of the whole. The transitions are so smoothly made that you seem to be all over the place at once, knowing the living members of three generations and all the skeletons and ghosts.

References

Further reading 
 
 
 

1946 American novels
Southern United States literature
Novels by Eudora Welty
Novels set in Mississippi
Fiction set in 1923